Erin Township is one of sixteen townships in Hancock County, Iowa, USA.  As of the 2000 census its population was 218.

History
Erin Township was organized in 1879. It was originally settled chiefly by Irish immigrants, who named it Erin, the poetic form of Ireland.

Geography
According to the United States Census Bureau, Erin Township covers an area of 36.37 square miles (94.19 square kilometers).

Adjacent townships
 Britt Township (north)
 Garfield Township (northeast)
 Liberty Township (east)
 Twin Lake Township (southeast)
 Amsterdam Township (south)
 Magor Township (southwest)
 Boone Township (west)
 Orthel Township (northwest)

Cemeteries
The township contains Saint Patrick's Cemetery.

Major highways
  Iowa Highway 111

School districts
 West Hancock Community School District

Political districts
 Iowa's 4th congressional district
 State House District 11
 State Senate District 6

References
 United States Census Bureau 2008 TIGER/Line Shapefiles
 United States Board on Geographic Names (GNIS)
 United States National Atlas

External links
 US-Counties.com
 City-Data.com

Townships in Hancock County, Iowa
Townships in Iowa